Legare Furniture is a supplier of tool-free assembly furniture. The company is based in Fort Worth, Texas, USA, and was founded as Legare, L.P. (Limited Partners) in 2003 by Mike Markwardt, Brock Brandenberg and Howard Klion. Legare designs, imports and distributes its furniture throughout North America, Europe and Asia. The furniture is manufactured primarily in Southeast Asia and is sold through major retailers such as Pier 1, Walmart, Target, Sears, Kmart, Amazon, Staples, Costco, Conforama France, Bauhaus Germany, Mitre 10 New Zealand, TaoBao China, Sodimac South America and Ace Saudi Arabia. In January 2014, Legare, L.P. was purchased by the California holding company, Kittrich Corporation.

External links
 

Furniture companies of the United States